Neustrashimy (Неустрашимый, Dauntless) was a destroyer built for the Soviet Navy in the early 1950s. She was to be the prototype for an extended production run but only one ship was built. The Soviet Designation was Project 41. This was the first Soviet ship to be given a NATO reporting name being called the Tallinn class.

The ship was built by Zhdanov Shipyard, Leningrad, laid down 1950, Launched 29 January 1951, on extended trials between 28 January 1952 and commissioning on 31 January 1955. She served in the Baltic Fleet and was decommissioned February 1974

Design

This ship was the first true post war destroyer design, the  being essentially a pre-war design.

Hull
The ship had a flushed deck design which enabled it to be fully closed down for nuclear, biological and chemical (NBC) warfare, with air conditioning and improved heating. Some armour was fitted around the bridge and gun mountings. There were, however, some problems with seakeeping, particularly with the shape of the bow which led to the forward part of the ship being very wet.

Propulsion

The ship was fitted with a new high pressure steam turbine powerplant. The boilers and engine rooms were located in alternating spaces in a "unit machinery" arrangement. The powerplant could be fired up without pre-heating and proved 20% more economical than that of the Skoryy-class ships. This basic machinery was used for most subsequent Soviet steam powered ships.

Armament

The gun armament comprised two stabilised, enclosed dual purpose  mountings located in "A" and "Y" positions. Anti-aircraft artillery comprised four quad mountings with new  automatic guns. Anti-submarine weapons comprised two RBU-2500 anti-submarine mortars. Two quintuple torpedo tubes and up to 50 mines were also fitted.

Sensors
 Radar
 Ryf surface search
 Neptun Navigation
 Fut air search
 Sonar
 Pegas

An initial combat information and control system Plashnet-41 was used.

Luda-class DDG

According to Conway's All the World Fighting Ships 1947-1995 2nd edition, the Neustrashimy design was sold to China and became the basis for their Luda-class DDG.  However, due to the external resemblance between the Luda and the Kotlin classes, many analysts today claim that the Luda class is based on the Kotlin.

See also
List of ships of the Soviet Navy
List of ships of Russia by project number

References

External links
 Site in Russian Language

Destroyer classes
Destroyers of the Soviet Navy
Cold War destroyers of the Soviet Union
1951 ships
Ships built at Severnaya Verf